Grunya Yefimovna Sukhareva (alternative transliteration Suchareva) (11 November 1891 – 26 April 1981) was a Soviet child psychiatrist. She was the first to publish a detailed description of autistic symptoms in 1925. The original paper was in Russian and published in German a year later. Sula Wolff translated it in 1996 for the English-speaking world.

She initially used the term "schizoid psychopathy", "schizoid" meaning "eccentric" at the time, but later replaced it with "autistic (pathological avoidant) psychopathy" to describe the clinical picture of autism. The article was created almost two decades before the case reports of Hans Asperger and Leo Kanner, which were published while Sukhareva's pioneering work remained unnoticed. As Sukhareva’s autism research was translated and published in German-language journals within a year of its domestic publication in Russian, there existed no serious barrier to access of these materials by Asperger and Kanner. The precise reason for her extensive research remaining uncited in the work of these two scientists, however, cannot be precisely determined and is still a matter of discussion by experts. Her name was transliterated as "Ssucharewa" when her papers appeared in Germany, and the autism researcher Hans Asperger likely chose not to cite her work, due to his affiliation with the Nazi Party and her Jewish heritage.

Biography
Sukhareva was born in Kyiv to the Jewish family of Chaim Faitelevich and Rachil Iosifovna Sukhareva. Between 1917 and 1921, she worked in a psychiatric hospital in Kyiv. From 1921, she worked in Moscow, and from 1933 to 1935 she was leading the department of Psychiatry in Kharkiv University (Kharkiv Psychoneurological Institute).

Sukhareva studied autistic children, and described them in a way which has been compared to the modern description of autism in the DSM-5. She helped open schools for autistic children where they participated in multiple activities, such as gymnastics, drawing, and woodwork.

In 1935, Sukhareva founded a Faculty of Pediatric Psychiatry in the Central Institute of Postgraduate Medical Education. In 1938, she led a clinic of childhood psychosis under the Russian SFSR Ministry of Agriculture and Food. For many years, she worked as a councillor and leader of the Psychiatric Hospital of Kashchenko in Moscow.

Sukhareva believed that for personality disorders to appear in children and teenagers, a significant social factor was required. Some of the factors she discussed for personality disorders were a poor family environment and societal structure. She was a pioneer in using the method of suggestion, and fought for children's rights, stating that difficult children should not be sent to prisons, but to medical institutions. She also studied PTSD from war injuries sustained by children.

By order of the Moscow Department of Health, the Moscow Scientific and Practical Center for Mental Health of Children and Adolescents was named after Sukhareva, with the prefix G. E. Sukhareva appended to the front. The center is the leading-specialized medical institution for the treatment of suicidal states in children and adolescents under 18 years of age.

Sukhareva's patients
In 1926 then 1927, Sukhareva described six boys and five girls, as having what is now considered autism. These patients are some of the first to be identified as having the disorder. The patients, though anonymous, were described as follows: 
A 12-year-old who had taught himself to read at age five. He was physically awkward and preferred talking to adults instead of children. He was very interested in philosophy.
A gifted violinist who struggled socially.
A child with exceptional memory of numbers but with face blindness.
A child who had imaginary friends that lived in a fireplace.

Selected works 
 Sukhareva GE, Analysis of children's fantasies as a method of studying the emotional life of a child. Kyiv 1921.
 Sukhareva GE, Schizoid psychopathy in childhood. In the book: Questions of pedology and child psychoneurology, issue 2. M 1925; 157–187.
 Ssucharewa GE, Die schizoiden Psychopathien im Kindesalter. Monatsschrift für Psychiatrie und Neurologie 60: 235–261, 1926. 
 Sukhareva GE, To the problem of the structure and dynamics of children's constitutional psychopathies (schizoid forms). Journal of Neuropathology and Psychiatry, 1930; 6
 Sukhareva GE, Features of the structure of the defect in various forms of the course of schizophrenia (on children's and adolescent material). Neuropathology, psychiatry, mental hygiene, 1935; IV: II: 57–62.
 Sukhareva GE, Schizophrenia clinic in children and adolescents. Part I. Kharkov: Gosmedizdat of the USSR 1937; 107.
 Sukhareva GE, Clinic of epilepsy in children and adolescents. Problems of theoretical and practical medicine. M 1938; 234–261.
 Sukhareva GE, Psychogenic types of wartime reactions. Neuropathology and psychiatry, 1943; 12: 2: 3-10
 Sukhareva GE, Clinical lectures on children's psychiatry. T. 1. M: Medgiz 1955; 459.
 Sukhareva GE, Clinical lectures on children's psychiatry. T. II, Part 2. M: Medicine, 1959; 406.
 Sukhareva GE, Lapides M. I. About the work of the psycho-neurological cabinet for children and teenagers at the psycho-neurological dispensary and children's clinic. M 1959.
 Sukhareva GE, Yusevich L. S. Psychogenic pathological reactions (neuroses). In the book: A multivolume guide to pediatrics, t. 8. M 1965.
 Sukhareva GE, Clinical lectures on children's psychiatry. T. 3. M: Medicine 1965; 270
 Sukhareva GE, The role of the age factor in the clinic of children's psychoses. Journal of Neuropathology and Psychiatry 1970; 70: 10: 1514–1520.
 Sukhareva GE, Lectures on children's psychiatry (Selected Chapters). M: Medicine 1974; 320.
 Sukhareva GE, translated by Rebecchi K, Autistic Children, Amazon: 2022

References

1891 births
1981 deaths
20th-century Russian physicians
20th-century Russian women scientists
20th-century Ukrainian physicians
20th-century Ukrainian women scientists
Physicians from Kyiv
Recipients of the Order of Lenin
Autism researchers
Jewish physicians
Russian pediatricians
Russian psychiatrists
Russian women psychiatrists
Soviet pediatricians
Soviet women physicians
Ukrainian medical researchers
Ukrainian psychiatrists
Ukrainian women physicians
Women medical researchers